Rafał Dobrucki  (born 27 December 1976 Poland) is a Polish former speedway rider.

Career
On 25 July 1999 he won the Continental Final, which formed part of the 2000 Speedway Grand Prix Qualification. He went on to qualify as a permanent rider for the 2000 Speedway Grand Prix.

Speedway Grand Prix results

Career

Individual World Championship
1997 - 23rd place (1 points)
1999 - 25th place (8 points)
2000 - 21st place (16 points)
2004 - 29th place (5 points)

Individual U-21 World Championship
1995 - 11th place (6 points)
1996 - 6th place (10 points)
1997 - 2ns place (11 points +3)

Team World Championship
1995 - 6th place (0 points)
1996 - 2 points in Group A
1999 - 6 points in Semi-Final B
2000 - 4 points in Semi-Final A

European Club Champions' Cup
2000 - European Champion (13 points)
 2009 -  Toruń - European Champion (8 pts) Rivne

Individual Polish Championship
1995 - 3rd place

Individual U-21 Polish Championship
1994 - 3rd place
1995 - Polish Champion
1996 - 2nd place
1997 - 3rd place

Golden Helmet
 1998 - 2nd place
 1999 - 3rd place
 2007 - 2nd place

Silver Helmet (U-21)
1995 - Winner
1996 - 3rd place
1997 - Winner

Bronze Helmet (U-19)
1993 - 3rd place
1994 - 2nd place
1995 - Winner

See also
List of Speedway Grand Prix riders
Poland speedway team

References

1976 births
Living people
Polish speedway riders
People from Leszno
Sportspeople from Greater Poland Voivodeship
Oxford Cheetahs riders